Mita Khel is a town and union council in Bannu District of Khyber-Pakhtunkhwa. It is located at 33°0'59N 70°54'12E and has an altitude of 372 metres (1223).

References

Union councils of Bannu District
Populated places in Bannu District